Krzysztof Nykiel  (born August 8, 1982 in Łódź) is a Polish professional footballer who is a defender for Zawisza Bydgoszcz in the Polish I liga.

Career

Club
Nykiel made 6 appearances for Polonia Warsaw during the 2005-06 season, and made 21 appearances for Ruch during the 2007-08 season. He is still looking for his first goal in the Ekstraklasa.

In June 2011, he moved to Cracovia on a three-year contract.

References

External links
 

1982 births
Living people
Polish footballers
Polish beach soccer players
Korona Kielce players
Unia Janikowo players
Polonia Warsaw players
Ruch Chorzów players
MKS Cracovia (football) players
Ekstraklasa players
Footballers from Łódź
Association football defenders